Kamys-Samar Lakes is a lake group in Zhanakala District, West Kazakhstan Region, Kazakhstan.

There used to be fisheries in some of the lakes in the past, at the time of the Kazakh SSR, but in present times they are mostly dry or have become intermittent lakes.

Geography
The Kamys-Samar lakes are located in the northern Caspian Lowland, north of the Ryn Desert, a largely flat arid region dominated by salt marshes and salt flats. The water of the rivers on the area has been largely diverted for agricultural use. Still, in years of sufficient rain the Bolshoy Uzen and Maly Uzen rivers flow into the lake area.

Some of the largest lakes are Saryaydyn, Kanbakty and Aydyn. The Aralsor lake cluster is located to the west. To the northeast lie the lakes at the mouth of the Kushum.

See also
List of lakes of Kazakhstan
Sor (geomorphology)

References

External links

Fish fauna of the Kamish-Samar and Kushum lakes

Lake groups of Kazakhstan
West Kazakhstan Region